Harihar Airport  is the small private airport serving harihar, a city in the Karnataka state of India. The airport served as an air strip for private charter service.

Accidents and incidents
 On 12 May 2005, then Chief Minister, N. Dharam Singh, the Deputy Chief Minister, Siddaramaiah, the Revenue Minister, M.P. Prakash, escape from a possible accident while landing at the Harihar polyfibres airstrip. Pilot of the private aircraft told the senior executives of Harihar Polifibres that there was a ditch in the runway and the aircraft bumped owing to uneven surface.

See also

 Airports in India
 List of busiest airports in India by passenger traffic
 List of airports in Karnataka

References

Airports in Karnataka
Buildings and structures in Davanagere district
Transport in Davanagere district
Airports with year of establishment missing